Stanisław Brochwicz (1910 – March 1941) was a Polish journalist, far-right activist, Nazi collaborator, Gestapo and National Radical Organization member.

Biography
Before World War II, Brochwicz was a German agent. He was arrested by Polish counterintelligence and sentenced to death, but freed by Germans during the German invasion of Poland in 1939 before his sentence was carried out.

During the war, Brochwicz was a National Radical Organization member (1939–1940). In the Polish press, he wrote articles praising Nazi Germany and Adolf Hitler. In 1941, Brochwicz wrote Heroes or traitors? Memories of a political prisoner, in which he expressed his support for the Nazis.

Brochwicz was convicted of collaboration on 17 February 1941 by the verdict of the Polish Military Special Court, with a sentence of death. He was executed by an underground assassination squad, which stabbed him to death in March of that year.

References

1910 births
1941 deaths
20th-century Polish journalists
Nazis assassinated by Polish resistance
People executed by the Polish Underground State

Executed Polish collaborators with Nazi Germany
Deaths by stabbing in Poland
Volksdeutsche